Turbinaria ornata is a tropical brown algae of the order Fucales native to coral reef ecosystems of the South Pacific. It can quickly colonize these ecosystems due in part to its method of dispersing by detaching older and more buoyant fronds that travel on surface currents, sometimes in large rafts of many individual thalli, or fronds.  Some scientists are investigating whether the increase in density of seaweeds, and a decrease in living coral density, on coral reef ecosystems indicates a change in the health of the reef, focusing studies on this particular species of brown alga.

Anatomy and morphology 
Turbinaria ornata can alter its morphology and strength of macroalgae in response to hydrodynamic forces.

Distribution and habitat 
Turbinaria ornata have had a massive population explosion on the reefs around the globe due to their to alter their morphology according to hydrodynamic forces and their ability to produce air bladders that allow them to float to distant locations.

Human use and cultural significance
Turbinaria ornata has a wide variety of health benefits and is being researched for pharmaceutical purposes because of its antioxidant, anti-inflammatory, antidiabetic, antiproliferative, and neuroprotective effects on humans. Turbinaria ornata  has the proper compounds to be used as a potential source for reducing postprandial hyperglycemia in humans making it an alternative therapeutic approach in treating diabetes. Turbinaria ornata  can be grown and used as a natural alternative wastewater treatment that would reduce untreated dangerous chemicals from being dumped into land and water bodies. Compounds found in T. ornata can also be used to restore land and bodies of water that were previously contaminated by toxic and environmentally destructive chemicals.

References

Fucales
Taxa named by Jacob Georg Agardh